Joshua Lee (1783 – December 29, 1842) was an American physician and War of 1812 veteran who served one term as a United States representative from New York from 1835 to 1837.

Biography
Born in Hudson in 1783, he studied medicine and was licensed to practice in 1804.

War of 1812 
He was commissioned in 1811 by Gov. Daniel D. Tompkins as surgeon of Colonel Avery Smith's regiment of Infantry and served in that capacity during the War of 1812.

Political career 
He was supervisor of the town of Benton in 1815 and was a member of the New York State Assembly in 1817 and again in 1833.

Lee was elected as a Jacksonian to the Twenty-fourth Congress (March 4, 1835 – March 3, 1837).

Later career and death 
After leaving Congress, he resumed the practice of his profession. He was an unsuccessful candidate for election to the U.S. Senate in 1839. 

He died in Penn Yan, New York in 1842 and was interred in Lake View Cemetery.

References

1783 births
1842 deaths
People from New York (state) in the War of 1812
Members of the New York State Assembly
Jacksonian members of the United States House of Representatives from New York (state)
People from Hudson, New York
People from Benton, New York
Burials at Lake View Cemetery (Penn Yan, New York)
19th-century American politicians

Members of the United States House of Representatives from New York (state)